The don des vaisseaux (lit. "gift of ships of the line") was a subscription effort launched by Étienne François de Choiseul, Duke of Choiseul and secretary of State to the Navy in 1761 as an effort to rebuild the French naval power, diminished at the end of the Seven Years' War and in need for modernisation. Through this subscription, French provinces, cities, institutions or individuals contributed funds for the building of ships of the line, which were then named in their honour. The scheme raised 13 millions French livres and provided 18 ships, including two three-deckers, Ville de Paris and Bretagne.

The names of the ships were chosen to honour their patrons, either directly or by stating qualities with which the patrons wished to be associated. Some of the names became politically incompatible with the policies of the Convention nationale and were therefore renamed in 1794; some of the new names became in turn politically unacceptable after the Thermidorian Reaction, yielding new renamings in 1795.

The success of the operation encouraged the French state to renew it on several dire occasions: from 1782 to 1790, and later again under the Revolution and the Empire.

Background 
By the end of the Seven Years' War, the French Navy had sustained heavy casualties and lost thirty-two ships of the line: thirteen in isolated incidents, two at Cartegena, five during the siege of Louisbourg, five at the Battle of Lagos and seven at Quiberon Bay. As the State was already in debts, it was impossible to fund the reconstruction of the Navy by conventional means. Choiseul, secretary of State to the Navy, thus devised a scheme to have shipbuilding patronned by the French society directly.

In 1762, Choiseul suggested to Charles Antoine de La Roche-Aymon, then Archbishop of Narbonne who presided the Estates of Languedoc, to incite the delegates of Languedoc to fund a 74-gun ship to the Crown, in the hope that this would set and example and encourage emulation in other provinces.

Fundraising 

On 26 Novembre 1761, the archbishop gave a speech before the Estates of Langdoc, to the effect that they should

Langdoc obliged, and the example was followed the next year by the Estates of the provinces of Brittany, Burgundy, Artois, Flanders; the cities of Paris, Bordeaux, Montpellier, Marseille; some particular institutions such as the Posts, the Six Corps (corporations of the merchants of Paris), the Ferme générale, the Chambers of commerce; and even individuals.

Ships built through donations 
Of the 30 ships of the line built between 1760 and 1769, 18 were funded through donations totalling 13 million pounds. It is notably the case of the two three-deckers used during the Naval operations in the American Revolutionary War, Ville de Paris and Bretagne.

Renewal of the fundraising 
After a costly French defeat at the Battle of the Saintes, a new fundraising drive was organised, yielding five new ships. Another ship was later built from such funding during the Empire.

Notes and references 

 LA BRETAGNE, 1766. Le renouveau de la Marine Française après la guerre de Sept Ans